Elections to Coleraine Borough Council were held on 18 May 1977 on the same day as the other Northern Irish local government elections. The election used three district electoral areas to elect a total of 20 councillors.

Election results

Note: "Votes" are the first preference votes.

Districts summary

|- class="unsortable" align="centre"
!rowspan=2 align="left"|Ward
! % 
!Cllrs
! % 
!Cllrs
! %
!Cllrs
! %
!Cllrs
! % 
!Cllrs
!rowspan=2|TotalCllrs
|- class="unsortable" align="center"
!colspan=2 bgcolor="" | UUP
!colspan=2 bgcolor="" | DUP
!colspan=2 bgcolor="" | Alliance
!colspan=2 bgcolor="" | SDLP
!colspan=2 bgcolor="white"| Others
|-
|align="left"|Area A
|bgcolor="40BFF5"|41.2
|bgcolor="40BFF5"|3
|18.5
|1
|4.7
|0
|21.9
|1
|13.7
|1
|6
|-
|align="left"|Area B
|bgcolor="40BFF5"|52.4
|bgcolor="40BFF5"|4
|0.0
|0
|16.9
|1
|11.2
|1
|19.5
|1
|7
|-
|align="left"|Area C
|24.6
|3
|bgcolor="#D46A4C"|30.4
|bgcolor="#D46A4C"|1
|11.1
|1
|0.0
|0
|33.9
|2
|7
|-
|- class="unsortable" class="sortbottom" style="background:#C9C9C9"
|align="left"| Total
|38.2
|10
|17.6
|2
|10.6
|2
|10.5
|2
|23.1
|4
|20
|-
|}

Districts results

Area A

1973: 4 x UUP, 1 x SDLP, 1 x Independent Unionist
1977: 3 x UUP, 1 x SDLP, 1 x DUP, 1 x Independent Unionist
1973-1977 Change: DUP gain from UUP

Area B

1973: 5 x UUP, 2 x Alliance
1977: 4 x UUP, 1 x Alliance, 1 x SDLP, 1 x Independent Unionist
1973-1977 Change: SDLP gain from Alliance, Independent Unionist leaves UUP

Area C

1973: 4 x UUP, 2 x Independent, 1 x Alliance
1977: 3 x UUP, 2 x Independent, 1 x DUP, 1 x Alliance
1973-1977 Change: DUP gain from UUP

References

Coleraine Borough Council elections
Coleraine